Alfredo Baquerizo Moreno may refer to:

 Alfredo Baquerizo Moreno (1859–1951), a former president of Ecuador
 Alfredo Baquerizo Moreno (canton), also known as Jujan, in the Guayas province of Ecuador
 Alfredo Baquerizo Moreno (town), also known as Jujan, in the Alfredo Baquerizo Moreno canton, Guayas province, Ecuador